The 2016–17 San Diego Toreros men's basketball team represented the University of San Diego during the 2016–17 NCAA Division I men's basketball season. This was head coach Lamont Smith's second season at San Diego. The Toreros competed in the West Coast Conference and played their home games at the Jenny Craig Pavilion. They finished the season 13–18, 6–12 in WCC play to finish in seventh place. They lost in the first round of the WCC tournament to Portland.

Previous season
The Toreros finished the 2015–16 season 9–21, 4–14 in WCC play to finish in last place. They lost in the first round of the WCC tournament to Loyola Marymount.

Departures

Incoming transfers

Recruits class of 2016

Roster

Schedule and results

|-
!colspan=12 style=| Non-conference regular season

|-
!colspan=12 style=| WCC regular season

|-
!colspan=9 style=| WCC tournament

See also
 2016–17 San Diego Toreros women's basketball team

References

San Diego Toreros men's basketball seasons
San Diego
San Diego Toreros
San Diego Toreros